Peter Nichols may refer to:

 Peter Nichols (author) (born 1950), American author
 Peter Nichols (playwright) (1927–2019), English playwright
 Peter Nichols (journalist) (1928–1989), English newspaper journalist and author
 Peter Nichols, pseudonym of science fiction writer John Christopher (1922–2012)

See also
 Peter Nicholls (disambiguation)
 Peter Nicholson (disambiguation)